The Appleton Stakes is an American Thoroughbred horse race held annually near the end of March at Gulfstream Park in Hallandale Beach, Florida. A Grade III event raced on turf at a distance of 1 mile, it is open to horses age four and older.

Race history
The race was run in two divisions in 1969, 1971, 1972, 1973–1982, 1984–1985, and 1987.

Race distance
1952-   mile
1953–1964 –  mile
1965–1966 – 7 furlongs
1967–1971 – 1 mile
 1972 – 7 furlongs
1973–1982 – 1 mile
 1983 – 7 furlongs
1984–1990 – 1 mile
 1991 – 1 mile and 70 yards
1992–2000 –  mile
2001–2008 – 1 mile
2009–2010 –  furlongs
2011 onwards – 1 mile

Records
Most wins:
 2 – Better Bee (1958, 1959)

Winners since 1999

Earlier winners

 1998 – Sir Cat
 1997 – Montjoy
 1996 – The Vid
 1995 – Dusty Screen
 1994 – Paradise Creek
 1993 – Cigar Toss
 1992 – Royal Ninja
 1991 – Jolies Halo
 1990 – Highland Springs
 1989 – Fabulous Indian
 1988 – Yankee Affair
 1987 – Regal Flier
 1987 – Racing Star
 1986 – Cool
 1985 – Smart And Sharp
 1985 – Star Choice
 1984 – Super Sunrise
 1984 – Great Substance
 1983 – Northrop
 1982 – Gleaming Channel
 1982 – King of Mardi Gras
 1981 – North Course
 1981 – Drums Captain
 1980 – Morning Frolic
 1980 – Pipedreamer
 1979 – Fleet Gar
 1979 – Regal And Royal
 1978 – Do Lishus
 1978 – Qui Native
 1977 – Gay Jitterbug
 1977 – Cinteelo
 1976 – Step Forward
 1976 – Improviser
 1975 – Duke Tom
 1975 – Beau Bugle
 1974 – Right On
 1973 – Windtex
 1973 – Life Cycle
 1972 – No No Billy
 1972 – Mr. Pow Wow
 1971 – Rocky Mount
 1971 – Brokers Tip
 1970 – Prevailing
 1969 – Quite An Accent
 1969 – Go Marching
 1968 – Rego
 1967 – Canal
 1966 – Pollux
 1965 – Ampose
 1964 – Frankies Nod
 1963 – Key Issue
 1962 – Beau Purple
 1961 – Tudor Way
 1960 – Oligarchy
 1959 – Better Bee
 1958 – Better Bee
 1957 – Bardstown
 1956 – Mielleux
 1955 – Fly Wheel
 1954 – Dr. Stanley
 1953 – Battlefield
 1952 – Alerted

See also
Arthur I. Appleton

References
 The 2008 Appleton Handicap at the NTRA

Graded stakes races in the United States
Horse races in Florida
Turf races in the United States
Flat horse races for four-year-olds
Open mile category horse races
Horse races established in 1952
Gulfstream Park
1952 establishments in Florida